P500 or similar may refer to:

P-500 Bazalt, a cruise missile used by the Soviet and Russian navies
P-500 Clavinova, a Yamaha portable digital piano
Philippine five hundred-peso note
Commodore P500, a computer in the Commodore CBM-II series
LG Optimus One P500, a smartphone
Nikon Coolpix P500, a digital camera in the Nikon Coolpix Performance Series
Quadro P500, an Nvidia graphics card
ThinkStation P500, a Lenovo computer workstation
Toshiba Satellite P500, various laptops in the Toshiba Satellite P series

See also
P400 (disambiguation)
P600 (disambiguation)
Topographic prominence, often abbreviated as P followed by a number of metres